Shell Point can refer to:
 Shell Point, Florida, an unincorporated community
 Shell Point, South Carolina, a census-designated place
 Shell Point (Washington), a cape